Ak'ak'i Meipariani (28 February 1918 – 31 December 1995) was a Soviet Olympic fencer. He competed in the team épée event at the 1952 Summer Olympics.

References

External links
 

1918 births
1995 deaths
Soviet male fencers
Olympic fencers of the Soviet Union
Fencers at the 1952 Summer Olympics
Sportspeople from Tbilisi